Hugo Maximiliano Soria Sánchez (born February 16, 1990) is an Uruguayan footballer who plays for All Boys as a defensive midfielder.

Career
The Uruguayan Hugo Soria is a pleasant revelation of Uruguayan Football Association, and who came to Flamengo brought by the vice president of sports club, Kléber Leite. The young player took part in the youth team of Flamengo in 2007, the year he also played in the Champions Youth Cup, the youth team.

Player great footprint and marking, Hugo won the red and black fans that follow their matches in the database. The defensive midfielder was facing some difficulties with differences in language, but it will not hurt her involvement and participation within the field. The player was treated as a possible reinforcement for the professional team in a few years.

Namesake of another foreigner at the team of Flamengo, Argentinian Hugo Colace, who coincidentally worked in the same position, Hugo Sanchez took his first steps into lawns still Uruguayans.

In 2008 the player was joined by another foreigner in the team base by Santiago Trellez, but both were dismissed and did not come to pass by the professionals.

Honours
Youth team
 Flamengo
Copa Macaé: 2007
Torneio Internacional Circuito das Águas: 2007

References

External links

 Player profile @ Flapédia
 ogol

1990 births
Living people
Uruguayan footballers
Uruguayan expatriate footballers
Footballers from Paysandú
Uruguayan Primera División players
Primera Nacional players
Primera B de Chile players
Paysandú F.C. players
Danubio F.C. players
C.A. Rentistas players
All Boys footballers
San Luis de Quillota footballers
Deportes Iquique footballers
Association football midfielders
Uruguayan expatriate sportspeople in Argentina
Expatriate footballers in Argentina
Expatriate footballers in Chile]
Uruguayan expatriate sportspeople in Chile